WWRX (107.7 MHz) is a rhythmic contemporary music formatted FM radio station licensed to Bradford, Rhode Island, and serving the New London, Connecticut, area. The station is owned by Red Wolf Broadcasting and broadcasts with an ERP of 1.05 kW.

History
The station went on the air November 30, 1995 as WKCD, with a smooth jazz format; this was replaced with a modern adult contemporary format from 1999 to 2002 (under owners Back Bay Broadcasting and AAA Entertainment).   The current format launched on September 19, 2002; initially using the WHJM call sign, it became WWRX in 2004 after 103.7 FM in Westerly, Rhode Island, changed its call letters from WWRX-FM to WEEI-FM (it is now WVEI-FM). Under the direction of Brian Ram, who serves as Red Wolf's VP/Programming.

The station moved its city of license from Pawcatuck, Connecticut, to Ledyard, Connecticut, effective August 22, 2013. On December 24, 2013, WWRX changed its call letters to WSKP, swapping call letters with 1180 AM; the swap was reversed on April 23, 2014. WWRX again moved its community of license on November 16, 2015, from Ledyard, Connecticut, to Bradford, Rhode Island.

References

External links

Rhythmic contemporary radio stations in the United States
WRX
Radio stations established in 1996